Walter "Pete" Murphy (October 27, 1872 – January 12, 1946) was a college football player, lawyer, and state legislator.

University of North Carolina
He was a prominent center for the North Carolina Tar Heels football team of the University of North Carolina. Murphy was selected as a substitute for the All-Southern team of 1895.

1892
The 1892 Tar Heels claim a mythical Southern championship.

Politics
Murphy was an avid campaigner for the Democratic Party.

References

American football centers
1872 births
1946 deaths
People from Salisbury, North Carolina
American lawyers
Players of American football from North Carolina
19th-century players of American football
North Carolina Tar Heels football players